The 1977 Gulf British League season was the 43rd season of the top tier of speedway in the United Kingdom and the 13th season known as the British League.

Summary
Newport had dropped down to the National League but their riders transferred to the Bristol Bulldogs so the league retained 19 teams. Cradley Heath reverted to their nickname of Heathens after four years of being called United. The league was sponsored by Gulf Oil for a third season. 

White City Rebels won the title in only their second season of existence. The London team caused a surprise with their consistent form throughout the season with heavy scoring of Gordon Kennett leading the team. The success came from a group of five other riders hitting around a seven average to support Kennett. The five were Englishmen Mike Sampson, Steve Weatherley and Trevor Geer, Pole Marek Cieślak and Finn Kai Niemi. Wolverhampton Wolves signed 18 year-old Danish rider Hans Nielsen.

Kevin Holden of Poole Pirates had started the season in great form for his new club, following his move from Exeter Falcons. He was hitting over a 9 point average but sadly was killed during the home match against Reading on 27 April. After sliding into the fence he ruptured a blood vessel of the heart.

Final table
M = Matches; W = Wins; D = Draws; L = Losses; Pts = Total Points

British League Knockout Cup
The 1977 Speedway Star British League Knockout Cup was the 39th edition of the Knockout Cup for tier one teams. King's Lynn Stars were the winners.

First round

Second round

Quarter-finals

Semi-finals

Final

First leg

Second leg

King's Lynn Stars were declared Knockout Cup Champions, winning on aggregate 79-77.

Final leading averages

Riders & final averages
Belle Vue

 10.46
 8.96
 8.56
 7.87
 5.90
 5.07
 4.18
 3.72
 3.61
 2.30

Birmingham

 8.74
 6.36
 5.58
 5.00
 4.95
 4.75
 4.56
 4.10
 3.44

Bristol

 9.77
 9.23
 7.12
 6.39 
 6.06 
 4.61
 4.56
 3.71
 3.19
 3.17
 2.00

Coventry

 10.52
 8.22
 7.92
 7.79
 6.38
 6.23 
 3.85
 2.00

Cradley Heath

 10.35 
 8.34 
 7.86 
 6.54
 6.50
 6.00
 5.61

Exeter

 10.50 
 9.13
 8.59
 8.25
 6.48
 6.33
 6.21
 4.00

Hackney

 8.67 (5 matches only)
 7.45
 6.51
 6.34
 4.68
 4.19
 4.07
 3.88

Halifax

 8.11
 7.37
 7.14
 6.13
 6.10
 4.83
 4.81
 3.80
 2.81

Hull

 8.63 
 8.01
 6.61
 6.00
 5.44
 5.23
 4.69
 3.05

Ipswich

 10.18
 9.50
 7.97
 5.40
 5.24
 5.13
 5.07
 4.62

King's Lynn

 10.59
 9.78
 7.36 
 5.93
 5.17
 4.48
 4.07
 3.25
 2.17

Leicester

 8.92
 8.42
 6.68
 5.17
 4.74
 4.04
 4.00
 3.89
 3.33
 3.24
 2.96
 2.96
 2.29

Poole

 10.27 
 7.47
 7.02
 6.30
 5.54
 4.98
 4.56
 4.52

Reading

 10.32
 9.80 
 6.80
 6.05
 5.88
 5.58
 4.85
 4.37
 3.26
 2.53

Sheffield

 9.15
 8.84
 6.56
 5.43
 5.05
 4.31
 3.95
 3.25

Swindon

 9.72
 8.74 
 7.61
 6.67
 5.49
 5.48
 4.77
 3.04

White City

 10.41
 7.35
 7.32
 7.15
 6.85
 6.84
 5.07
 4.70

Wimbledon

 9.61
 7.80
 7.74
 7.32
 5.47
 5.46
 4.23
 3.67
 2.80
 2.40

Wolverhampton

 8.68
 8.17
 7.25
 5.70
 5.33
 4.69
 2.76

See also
List of United Kingdom Speedway League Champions
Knockout Cup (speedway)

References

British League
1977 in British motorsport
1977 in speedway